Dennis Bruce Allen (7 November 1951 – 13 April 1987) was an Australian drug dealer who was reported to have murdered many victims. He was based in Melbourne, and was the oldest son of criminal matriarch Kath Pettingill. Allen, whose solicitor was Andrew Fraser, avoided jail by having info on the corrupt Victorian police at the time. He died of heart disease in 1987 in prison custody awaiting trial for murder.

Criminal career 
Allen, nicknamed Mr. Death or Mr. D, was believed to have been involved in up to 13 underworld murders, including the dismembering of Hells Angels biker Anton Kenny with a chainsaw in 1985. One victim who survived was guitarist Chris Stockley of The Dingoes, whom Allen shot in the stomach while attempting to gatecrash a party. Allen received a ten-year prison sentence for rape during the 1970s.  It is also reported that he was a major drug dealer in the Richmond and South Yarra areas of Melbourne during the 1980s. 
New South Wales Police Detective-Sergeant Roger Rogerson was convicted of supplying heroin in a deal with Allen, but was acquitted following appeal. Allen avoided capture and prosecution for his crimes by having vital information against several corrupt members of the Victorian police.

Death 
Allen died on 13 April 1987 of heart failure at St. Vincent's Hospital, Melbourne; "pieces of his heart actually broke off after decades of heavy drug abuse". His funeral was conducted by Father Peter Norden, a Jesuit priest who performed funerals for three members of the Pettingill family during the 1980s.

Notes

References 

Australian people convicted of rape
Australian drug traffickers
Australian rapists
Pettingill family
Australian people who died in prison custody
1951 births
1987 deaths
Prisoners who died in Victoria (Australia) detention
Drug-related deaths in Australia
Criminals from Melbourne
Drug dealers
People charged with murder

it:Dennis Allen